Lonchocarpus is a plant genus in the legume family (Fabaceae). The species are called lancepods due to their fruit resembling an ornate lance tip or a few beads on a string.

''Cubé resin is produced from the roots of L. urucu and namely 'L. utilis (cubé). It contains enough of the toxic rotenoids rotenone and deguelin to be used as an insecticide and piscicide. As these are naturally occurring compounds, they were formerly used in organic farming. Since it is highly unselective and kills useful, as well as pest, animals, it is considered harmful to the environment today. Also, chronic exposure to rotenone and deguelin appears to increase the risk of Parkinson's disease, even in mammals, for which these compounds are less immediately toxic than for fish and insects. Deguelin might be useful in cancer therapy if it can be applied directly into tumors, and Lonchocarpus root is used to a probably insignificant extent by indigenous peoples as an aid in fish stunning, e.g. by the Nukak who call it nuún.

The bark of L. violaceus (balché tree) is traditionally used by the Yukatek Maya version of the mildly intoxicating mead, balché, which was held in the highest esteem in antiquity and considered sacred to the god of intoxication. It is still drunk today and was, after the Spanish conquest of Yucatán, considered a less harmful alternative to the alcoholic beverages imported by the Europeans. It is not quite clear if roots were also used to produce balché, and to what extent toxic isoflavones are also present in L. violaceus. The potency of balché may be increased by using honey produced from L. violaceus nectar foraged by the Maya people's traditional stingless bees.

Certain insects have evolved the ability to deal with Lonchocarpus toxins and feed on these plants. They include a possible new Lepidopteran taxon in the two-barred flasher (Astraptes fulgerator) cryptic species complex which seems to have acquired this trait only quite recently in its evolutionary history and is known to be found on L. costaricensis and L. oliganthus.

Species

Selected species include:
 Lonchocarpus calcaratus
 Lonchocarpus capassa Rolfe
 Lonchocarpus chiricanus
 Lonchocarpus kanurii
 Lonchocarpus laxiflorus
 Lonchocarpus minimiflorus
 Lonchocarpus molinae
 Lonchocarpus phaseolifolius
 Lonchocarpus phlebophyllus
 Lonchocarpus pluvialis – cuquí
 Lonchocarpus retiferus
 Lonchocarpus sanctuarii
 Lonchocarpus santarosanus – chapelno blanco
 Lonchocarpus trifolius
 Lonchocarpus urucu – barbasco
 Lonchocarpus utilis – cubé, common lancepod
 Lonchocarpus violaceus (Jacq.) Kunth
 Lonchocarpus yoroensis

Footnotes

References
  (2006): Problems with DNA barcodes for species delimitation: ‘ten species’ of Astraptes fulgerator reassessed (Lepidoptera: Hesperiidae). Systematics and Biodiversity 4(2): 127–132.  PDF fulltext
  (2004): Rotenone, deguelin, their metabolites, and the rat model of Parkinson's disease. Chemical Research in Toxicology 17(11): 1540-1548.   (HTML abstract)
  (2004): Ten species in one: DNA barcoding reveals cryptic species in the semitropical skipper butterfly Astraptes fulgerator. PNAS 101(41): 14812-14817.  PDF fulltext Supporting Appendices
  (1997): Cancer Chemopreventive Activity Mediated by Deguelin, a Naturally Occurring Rotenoid. Cancer Research 57'''(16): 3424-3428.  PDF fulltext

 
Taxonomy articles created by Polbot
Fabaceae genera